Q50 may refer to:
 Q50 (New York City bus)
 Infiniti Q50, an automobile
 ITU-T Recommendation Q.50, a telecommunications standard
 Qaf (surah), the 50th surah of the Quran